Florian Guillou (born 29 December 1982) is a French former racing cyclist. He rode in the 2014 Tour de France, finishing 62nd – his only Grand Tour start.

Major results

2006
 1st Stage 3b Kreiz Breizh Elites
2007
 3rd Flèche Ardennaise
 6th Overall Grand Prix Chantal Biya
2008
 2nd Grand Prix de la ville de Pérenchies
 8th Classic Loire Atlantique
2009
 4th Tour du Doubs
 4th Grand Prix de la ville de Pérenchies
 10th Overall Tour de Picardie
2010
 7th Overall Tour du Haut Var
 8th Tour du Doubs
 10th Overall Tour Méditerranéen
2011
 3rd Overall Tour du Limousin
 6th Val d'Ille Classic
2012
 6th Overall Tour of Turkey
 9th Boucles de l'Aulne
 10th Overall Tour du Gévaudan Languedoc-Roussillon
2013
 6th Tour du Doubs
 7th Overall Tour of Turkey
2014
 1st  Mountains classification Tour du Haut Var

References

External links
 

1982 births
Living people
French male cyclists
People from Concarneau
Sportspeople from Finistère
Cyclists from Brittany